The TSV Aubstadt is a German association football club from the town of Aubstadt, Bavaria.

The club qualified for the new northern division of the expanded Bayernliga in 2012, the fifth tier of the German football league system. In 2019, the team promoted to tier-four Regionalliga Bayern after winning the Bayernliga Nord championship.

History
For most of its history the club has been a non-descript amateur side in local Bavarian football. In post-Second World War football Aubstadt played in the local C-Klasse, the lowest division of the Bavarian football league system. It won promotion to the B-Klasse in 1961 and on to the A-Klasse four years later in 1965. In the 1980s and early 1990s the club won promotion to the Bezirksliga from the A-Klasse twice but was relegated again each time. In 1993 it permanently left local football when it won promotion to the Bezirksliga again which was followed by a title in this league in 1994.

The later won promotion to the tier five Bezirksoberliga Unterfranken, then the highest football league in Lower Franconia, in 1994. It spent two seasons at this level, coming 13th in its first year there but winning the league the year after and earning promotion to the Landesliga Bayern-Nord. Three seasons in the Landesliga followed in which the club never finished better than 13th and was relegated again in 1999.

A runners-up finish back in the Bezirksoberliga in 1999–2000 took TSV straight back up to the Landesliga but again the club could never break into the upper half of the table and was relegated again after four seasons.

The club now spent the next four seasons in the Bezirksoberliga Unterfranken where it finished as low as twelfth in 2006 but won the league for a second time in 2008. TSV Aubstadt's third stint in the Landesliga threatened to become as unsuccessful as the first two with a 9th, 15th and 13th-place finish in the following seasons. The league's final season, 2011–12 however was also the clubs best, finishing runners-up and qualifying for the new northern division of the Bayernliga.

In the Bayernliga the club came eighth in its first season there but finished runners-up in 2013–14. Having received approval for a Regionalliga Bayern licence the team took part in the promotion round but failed in the first of two rounds, losing 7–3 on aggregate to 1. FC Schweinfurt 05.

Honours
 Bayernliga Nord (V)
 Champions: 2019
 Runners-up: (2) 2014, 2018
 Landesliga Bayern-Nord (VI)
 Runners-up: 2012
 Bezirksoberliga Unterfranken (VI-VII)
 Champions: 1996, 2008
 Runners-up: 2000
 Bezirksliga Unterfranken-Ost (VI)
 Champions: 1994
 A-Klasse (VI-VII)
 Champions: 1981, 1986, 1993
 B-Klasse (VII)
 Champions: 1965
 C-Klasse (VII)
 Champions: 1958, 1961

Recent seasons
The recent season-by-season performance of the club:

With the introduction of the Bezirksoberligas in 1988 as the new fifth tier, below the Landesligas, all leagues below dropped one tier. With the introduction of the Regionalligas in 1994 and the 3. Liga in 2008 as the new third tier, below the 2. Bundesliga, all leagues below dropped one tier. With the establishment of the Regionalliga Bayern as the new fourth tier in Bavaria in 2012 the Bayernliga was split into a northern and a southern division, the number of Landesligas expanded from three to five and the Bezirksoberligas abolished. All leagues from the Bezirksligas onwards were elevated one tier.
 The 2020–21 Regionalliga Bayern season has been cancelled due to the COVID-19 pandemic in Germany, and the original 2019–20 season was extended until spring 2021.

Key

References

External links 
 Official team site  
 Das deutsche Fußball-Archiv  historical German domestic league tables 
 Manfreds Fussball Archiv  Tables and results from the Bavarian amateur leagues
 TSV Aubstadt at Weltfussball.de  

Football clubs in Germany
Football clubs in Bavaria
Football in Lower Franconia
Association football clubs established in 1921
1921 establishments in Germany
Rhön-Grabfeld